Junior Efueko Osagie (born January 15, 1985 in Edo State) is a Nigerian football player currently with Hapoel Jerusalem.

Career 
Osagie started his career in his home town club, Insurance FC, and moved to Dolphin FC, Port Harcourt in 2005. After one season with Dolphin FC, his goal scoring exploits caught the attention of Rangers Intl. FC, Enugu, where he was transferred in a big money move. Junior excelled in Rangers and was often voted their best player in the season he spent there. His exploits in Enugu, led to another big money move to Enyimba FC of Aba, who were then the best club in the country. He helped Enyimba to win the CAF Champions league. During this time, his skills and goal scoring feat led to a transfer to Club Africain in Tunisia. After two seasons in Tunisia, Enyimba once again swooped for him. 
. November 2012 his comeback with Nigeria Premier League side NPA Warri Wolves.

International 
Osagie won many caps as a junior international and has 4 caps with the senior national team.

Notes 

1985 births
Living people
Nigerian footballers
Dolphin F.C. (Nigeria) players
Association football midfielders
Enyimba F.C. players
Bendel Insurance F.C. players
Rangers International F.C. players
Hapoel Jerusalem F.C. players
Expatriate footballers in Israel
Liga Leumit players